Sumit Sarkar (born 1939) is an Indian historian of modern India. He is the author of Swadeshi Movement.

Early life, education and career
He was born to Susobhan Sarkar. His maternal uncle was Prasanta Chandra Mahalanobis.

He completed his BA (Honours) in history at Presidency College, Calcutta and MA and Ph.D. in the same subject at the University of Calcutta. He taught for many years as a lecturer at the University of Calcutta, and later as a reader at the University of Burdwan. He completed his postdoctoral fellowship at Wolfson College, Oxford. He was professor of history at the University of Delhi.

Awards
He was awarded the Rabindra Puraskar literary award for his book Writing Social History by the West Bengal government in 2004. He returned the award in 2007 in protest against the expulsion of farmers from their land.

Controversy
He was one of the founding members of the Subaltern Studies Collective, but later distanced himself from the project. He noted that arguments made in the later issues of the journal as well as in books by Partha Chatterjee blanketly criticized Enlightenment, the nation-state and secularism lined up with indigenist critiques that were at home with the Hindu right. In his view this error was traceable to a basic confusion in the early project that posed an absolute separation between the elite and subaltern domains.

He contributed a volume to the Towards Freedom project of the Indian Council of Historical Research (ICHR), publication of which was blocked in 2000 by the ICHR under the influence of then Indian government administered by the Bharatiya Janata Party as alleged by Sarkar. The publication of the volume was eventually allowed by the Government of India once the Congress party came to power after the general election of 2004.

Publications
 Modern Times(Ranikhet, 2014)
Towards Freedom: Documents on the Movement for Independence in India, 1946, (New Delhi, 2007)
Beyond Nationalist Frames: Post-Modernism, Hindu Fundamentalism, History, (Delhi, 2002)
Writing Social History, (Delhi, 1998)
Khaki Shorts and Saffron Flags: A Critique of the Hindu Right, (with Tapan Basu, Pradip Datta, Tanika Sarkar and Sambuddha Sen; Orient Longman, 1993). .
Modern India: 1885-1947, (Basingstoke, 1989)
The Swadeshi Movement in Bengal, 1903-1908, (New Delhi, 1973)

References

External links
 The Decline of the Subaltern in Subaltern Studies
 "Delhi Historians Group's Publication "Communalization of Education: The History Textbooks Controversy", A report in 2002, New Delhi: Jawaharlal Nehru University, India.

1939 births
Bengali Hindus
Bengali-language writers
20th-century Bengalis
Presidency University, Kolkata alumni
University of Calcutta alumni
Academic staff of the University of Calcutta
Academic staff of the University of Burdwan
Academic staff of Delhi University
Academic staff of Jawaharlal Nehru University
Bengali historians
Brahmos
Fellows of Wolfson College, Oxford
Historians of South Asia
Historians of colonialism
20th-century Indian historians
Living people
Indian Marxist historians
Indian political writers
Writers about Hindu nationalism
Indian lecturers
Indian male writers
20th-century Indian writers
20th-century Indian male writers
Indian writers
Indian historians
Indian scholars
20th-century Indian scholars
Scholars from West Bengal
English-language writers from India
People from Kolkata district